Schoenoplectus torreyi, common name Torrey bulrush or Torrey's bulrush, is a species of Schoenoplectus found in North America.

Conservation status in the United States
It is listed as endangered and extirpated in Maryland, as endangered in Indiana and Pennsylvania, as threatened in Connecticut, as presumed extirpated in Ohio, and as a special concern in Rhode Island.

References

Flora of North America
torreyi